This is the official discography and videography for the Finnish rock band The 69 Eyes. This page includes all studio albums as well as compilation and live albums. It also features the singles the band has released and the compilation albums they have been included in.

Discography

Studio albums

Compilation albums

Live albums

EP's
High Times, Low Life (1992)
Music for Tattooed Ladies & Motorcycle Mamas Vol 1 (1993)
Velvet Touch (1995)
Love Runs Away (2013)
Drive (2022)

7 Inch vinyl
 "Sugarman" (1990)
 "Barbarella" (1991)
 "Juicy Lucy" (1991)
 "High Times, Low Life" (1992)
 "Never Too Loud!" (1994)
 "Deuce AKA Suck My Mike!" (1994)
 "Supershow" (Split with Backyard Babies) (1996)
 "Gothic Girl" (red vinyl) (2007)
 "Wrap Your Troubles in Dreams" (red vinyl) (2007)

Singles

Videography
Wasting The Dawn (1999)
Helsinki Vampires (2003)

References

69 Eyes, The
Discographies of Finnish artists